Jean-Joël Barbier (25 March 1920 – 1 June 1994) was a French writer and pianist.

Born in Belfort, Barbier began studying literature and music with Blanche Selva and Lazare Lévy but was interrupted by the onset of World War II.

He was a reasonably prolific writer in France, publishing A Dictionary of French Musicians in 1961 and collaborating with La Revue Musicale on a frequent basis. As a pianist, he played mostly the works of French composers such as Claude Debussy, Emmanuel Chabrier and Déodat de Séverac. He later recorded the complete piano works of Erik Satie and it is for this he is now best known.

He died in Paris.

1920 births
1994 deaths
20th-century French male classical pianists
Writers from Belfort
Musicians from Belfort